Cedar Island is a 10-acre (4 ha) island located in Lake Champlain.  It is the southernmost of three islands to the east of South Hero, Vermont.  Cedar Island lies approximately two miles (3.2 km) north of the Sand Bar Bridge.

Cedar Island is privately owned and accessible only by boat.

External links 

Lake islands of Vermont
Islands of Lake Champlain
South Hero, Vermont
Islands of Grand Isle County, Vermont
Private islands of the United States